You may be looking for Undine South Harbour near Ducloz Head, South Georgia

Undine Harbour is a small bay at the head of the embayment between Cape Paryadin and Cape Chaplin on the south coast of South Georgia. This feature (with Johan Harbour, Coal Harbour, and Frida Hole, q.v.) may form, part of the feature called "Adventure Bay" by James Weddell, 1823, and "Discovery Bay" by DI, 1929. The recommended name Undine Harbour, after the sealing ship Undine of the Compania Argentina de Pesca, has been consistently used for this bay since about 1912. It is separated from Elsehul by a narrow isthmus.

Johan Harbor is a small bay 0.5 nautical miles (0.9 km) southwest of Undine Harbor. The name "Johann Harbour" was used on a chart resulting from a survey of this area by DI personnel in 1926–27. The SGS reported in 1957 that "Johan" is the correct spelling of the name, which is well known locally.

Laurie Point is the east extremity of a small island which lies close to shore and marks the south side of the entrance to the harbor on the south coast and near the west end of South Georgia. It was surveyed by the SGS, 1956–57, and named by the United Kingdom Antarctic Place-Names Committee (UK-APC) for A.H. Laurie, member of the scientific staff of the Discovery Investigations Marine Station, Grytviken, in 1930–31, who also worked on the William Scoresby in 1929-30 and on Discovery II in 1930.

See also
Bill Inlet
Birdie Rocks
Chaplin Head

Bays of South Georgia